Fernando Sandoval (18 November 1942 – 1 May 2020) was a Brazilian water polo player. He competed in the men's tournament at the 1968 Summer Olympics. He died from complications due to COVID-19 during the COVID-19 pandemic in Brazil.

References

1942 births
2020 deaths
Brazilian male water polo players
Olympic water polo players of Brazil
Water polo players at the 1968 Summer Olympics
Water polo players from São Paulo
Deaths from the COVID-19 pandemic in São Paulo (state)